This is a list of named geological features on asteroid 433 Eros.

Regions

Regions (geologically distinct areas) on Eros are named after the co-discoverers of the asteroid.

Dorsa

Dorsa (ridges) on Eros are named after astronomers who studied the asteroid.

Craters

Craters on Eros are named after famous lovers.

External links
 USGS: Eros nomenclature

433 Eros
Eros
Eros